Hemavati (pronounced hēmavati) is a ragam in Carnatic music (musical scale of South Indian classical music). It is the 58th Melakarta rāgam in the 72 melakarta rāgam system of Carnatic music.

It is called Simhāravam or Deshi Simhāravam in Muthuswami Dikshitar school of Carnatic music. It is beloved especially of nadaswaram vidwans. It is said to be borrowed into Hindustani music from Carnatic music, especially with instrumentalists.

Structure and Lakshana

Hemavati is the 4th rāgam in the 10th chakra Disi. The mnemonic name is Disi-Bhu. The mnemonic phrase is sa ri gi mi pa dhi ni. Its  structure (ascending and descending scale) is as follows (see swaras in Carnatic music for details on below notation and terms):
: 
: 

As it is a melakarta rāgam, by definition it is a sampoorna rāgam (has all seven notes in ascending and descending scale). It is the prati madhyamam equivalent of Kharaharapriya, which is the 22nd melakarta.

Janya rāgams 
Hemavati has a few minor janya rāgams (derived scales) associated with it. See List of janya rāgams to view all rāgams associated with Hemavati.

Compositions
Here are a few common compositions sung in concerts, set to Hemavati.

Sree Kanthimathim,Hariyuvatheem Hymavathim and Madhurambikayam by Muthuswami Dikshitar
Ika talanenura ina by S. Ramanathan
Ennai kaatharulvathu,Paripalanai by Papanasam Sivan
Mantrini Maathanga by Harikesanallur Muthaiah Bhagavathar
Neesarisaati  by Tyagaraja
Nee pada sarasa rathulaku by Nallanchakravarthula Krishnamacharyulu

Film Songs

Language:Tamil

Related rāgams
This section covers the theoretical and scientific aspect of this rāgam.

Hemavati's notes when shifted using Graha bhedam, yields 3 other major melakarta rāgams, namely, Keeravani, Vakulabharanam and Kosalam. Graha bhedam is the step taken in keeping the relative note frequencies same, while shifting the shadjam to the next note in the rāgam. For further details and an illustration refer Graha bhedam on Keeravani.

In Western music, Hemavati corresponds to Ukrainian Dorian scale.

Notes

References

Melakarta ragas